Luna 18, part of the Ye-8-5 series, was an unmanned space mission of the Luna program.

Overview
Luna 18 was placed in an Earth parking orbit after it was launched and was then sent towards the Moon. On 7 September 1971, it entered lunar orbit. The spacecraft completed 85 communications sessions and 54 lunar orbits before it was sent towards the lunar surface by use of braking rockets. It impacted the Moon on 11 September 1971, at 3 degrees 34 minutes N, 56 degrees 30 minutes E (selenographic coordinates) in a rugged mountainous terrain. Signals ceased at the moment of impact.

This mission was the seventh Soviet attempt to recover soil samples from the surface of the Moon and the first after the success of Luna 16. After two mid-course corrections on 4 September and 6 September 1971, Luna 18 entered a circular orbit around the Moon on 7 September at 100 kilometers altitude with an inclination of 35°. After several more orbital corrections, on 11 September, the vehicle began its descent to the lunar surface. Contact with the spacecraft was lost at 07:48 UT at the previously determined point of lunar landing. Impact coordinates were 3°34' north latitude and 56°30' east longitude, near the edge of the Mare Fecunditatis ("Sea of Fertility"). Officially, the Soviets announced that "the lunar landing in the complex mountainous conditions proved to be unfavorable." Later, in 1975, the Soviets published data from Luna 18s continuous-wave radio altimeter that determined the mean density of the lunar topsoil.

See also
 List of artificial objects on the Moon

References

External links

 Zarya - Luna programme chronology
 NASA NSSDC Master Catalog

Luna programme
Sample return missions
Missions to the Moon
1971 in spaceflight
1971 in the Soviet Union
Spacecraft that impacted the Moon
Spacecraft that orbited the Moon
Spacecraft launched in 1971
1971 on the Moon